Aaron Cleare (born 31 January 1983) is a Bahamian athlete who specializes in the 400 metres. He was a member of the Bahamian 4 x 400 metres relay team that finished 6th in the 2004 Olympics.
He went to college at Dickinson State University, located in Dickinson, North Dakota.

External links

sports-reference

Bahamian male sprinters
1983 births
Living people
Athletes (track and field) at the 2004 Summer Olympics
Olympic athletes of the Bahamas
Dickinson State University alumni